The 2020–21 season was FC Shakhtar Donetsk's 30th season in existence and the club's 22nd consecutive season in the top flight of Ukrainian football. In addition to the domestic league, Shakhtar Donetsk participated in this season's editions of the Ukrainian Cup, the Ukrainian Super Cup, the UEFA Champions League and the UEFA Europa League. The season covers the period from 18 August 2020 to 30 June 2021.

Season events
On 11 August, it was announced that Shakhtar Donetsk would play their home games for the up-coming season at the NSC Olimpiyskiy in Kyiv.

On 17 September, Danylo Sikan was loaned to Mariupol for the season.

On 13 December 2020, Shakhtar's game against Inhulets Petrove scheduled for later in the day was called off due to the poor condition of the pitch in Kropyvnytskyi. Subsequently, the match was awarded as a 3–0 victory to Shakhtar.

On 1 February, Shakhtar Donetsk confirmed that Viktor Kovalenko had left the club to sign for Atalanta.

On 13 February, Shakhtar Donetsk's game away to Kolos Kovalivka was postponed due to bad weather, and moved to the Valeriy Lobanovskyi Dynamo Stadium in Kyiv to be played on 14 February.

On 12 May, three days after the end of the season, Shakhtar Donetsk announced that manager Luís Castro would be leaving the club after two-years in charge.

Squad

On loan

Transfers

Out

Loans out

Released

Friendlies

Competitions

Overview

Premier League

League table

Results summary

Results by round

Results

Ukrainian Cup

Ukrainian Super Cup

UEFA Champions League

Group stage

The group stage draw was held on 1 October 2020.

UEFA Europa League

Knockout phase

The round of 32 draw was be held on 14 December 2020.

Squad statistics

Appearances and goals

|-
|colspan="16"|Players away on loan:
|-
|colspan="16"|Players who left Shakhtar Donetsk during the season:

|}

Goalscorers

Clean sheets

Disciplinary record

References

External links

FC Shakhtar Donetsk seasons
Shakhtar Donetsk
Shakhtar Donetsk